Doldowlod railway station stood on the Mid Wales Railway between Builth Wells and Rhayader. It was closed on 31 December 1962 and the track removed.

History
Doldowlod on Wye railway station was opened by the Mid-Wales Railway on 21 September 1864. The Mid Wales Railway got into financial difficulties and a working arrangement was made with the Cambrian Railways on 2 April 1888; who took over the line on 24 June 1904. The line later became part of the Great Western Railway.

The station along with the rest of the former Mid Wales Railway line was closed by the British Transport Commission on 31 December 1962.

References

Notes

Sources

Further reading

Disused railway stations in Powys
Railway stations in Great Britain opened in 1864
Railway stations in Great Britain closed in 1962
Former Cambrian Railway stations